Philippovskaya School is a private school located in Moscow city, Khamovniki district. Named after St. Philip, Metropolitan of Moscow. The official symbol of Philippovskaya school is a horse with one wing from the paintings in St. Demetrius Cathedral in Vladimir: antique Pegasus.

References

http://forum.fschool.ru
http://private-education.ru/school/filippovskaya_shko
http://www.schoolioneri.com/item/filippovskaya-shkola
http://www.spr.ru/otzyvy/filippovskaya-shkola.html

Schools in Moscow
Private schools in Asia
Educational institutions with year of establishment missing